Paraphyola is a genus of picture-winged flies in the family Ulidiidae.

Species
 P. angustifrons
 P. crucifera

References

Ulidiidae